Carl Gustav Oskar Aagaard (September 18, 1852 – January 16, 1927) was a Norwegian writer and priest. His stories were primarily of a religious nature, but he also published later stories that were generally entertaining, but with a strongly emphasized moralizing tendency. He is also known for his hymns.

Gustav Aagaard was the brother of the author Oscar Aagaard (1855–1936).

Works
 Fra tusmørketimerne (From the Twilight Hours, 1892)
 Sjøluft: billeder i digt (Sea Air: Pictures in Poetry, 1893)
 Min solstraale: fortælling (My Sunbeam: A Story, 1895)
 Speilbilleder: en fortælling (Mirror Images: A Story, 1896)
 Sterke hænder (Strong Hands, 1897)
 En spøgelseshistorie (A Ghost Story, 1899)
 I skygger og lys (In Shadows and Light, 1900)
 Keiser Felix: fortælling (Emperor Felix: A Story, 1904)
 Til min kjære: nogen av mine digte og sange: til minde (To My Love: Some of my Poems and Songs: In Memory, 1921)

Filmography
 1921 Felix

References

External links

1852 births
1927 deaths
19th-century Norwegian Lutheran clergy
Norwegian hymnwriters
20th-century Norwegian Lutheran clergy